John Holbrook Groberg (born June 17, 1934) has been a general authority of the Church of Jesus Christ of Latter-day Saints (LDS Church) since 1976. He is the author of The Eye of the Storm, and was the protagonist in the movie made from the book titled The Other Side of Heaven.

Groberg was born to Delbert V. and Jennie Groberg in Idaho Falls, Idaho in 1934. He grew up in Idaho Falls during and after the Great Depression. Groberg received a bachelor's degree from Brigham Young University (BYU) and an MBA from Indiana University. He was involved in real estate in the Idaho Falls area.

Mission to Tonga
Groberg served as a missionary of the LDS Church in Tonga. He experienced much difficulty in getting to Tonga: he was prevented from arriving by strikes, visa problems, and transport issues. Groberg served briefly in Los Angeles, Samoa, and Fiji while waiting for his transport to be finalized. When he finally arrived in Tonga, his first assignment was on the remote island of Niuatoputapu, which had had only limited contact with the outside world in the form of an occasional telegraph and a visiting boat. During the year he spent on the island, Groberg suffered from mosquitoes, a typhoon, and starvation. His missionary companion on Niuatoputapu was Feki Po'uha, who would later serve as district president in Niue, while Groberg was president of the church's Tongan Mission (which at that point included Niue).

After a year on Niuatoputapu, Groberg was assigned to more developed islands and served as a district president supervising smaller branch congregations of the church. Groberg later reported that the branches he dealt with lacked unity and morality. He had little contact with his supervising mission president and nearly drowned when pushed out of a boat during a major storm; he also suffered from exhaustion frequently. Groberg was denied an extension to his mission that would have allowed him to accompany a group of church converts to the New Zealand Temple.

Groberg wrote a book about his mission from his memoirs called In the Eye of the Storm, which was adapted into the 2001 Disney film The Other Side of Heaven. The New York Times explains of Groberg's character, "The narrator and hero of The Other Side of Heaven, is a Mormon missionary dispatched to the Tongan islands in the Pacific Ocean immediately after his high school graduation in the 1950s." A sequel to the film, The Other Side of Heaven 2: Fire of Faith, was made in 2018 with the same actor, Christopher Gorham, in the role of Groberg.

LDS Church service
Groberg served as a bishop in Idaho Falls from 1960 to 1965. He then returned to Tonga as president of the Tonga-Fiji mission, which included Niue, serving from 1965 to 1968. In 1970, Groberg became a regional representative with the assignment to oversee church's operations in Tonga.

In April 1976, Groberg became an LDS Church general authority. In the mid-1990s, he was president of the church's Asia Area, where he was closely connected with the initial sending of church missionaries into Cambodia. He later served as president of the church's Utah South Area, where he was responsible for initiating programs for missionary work among the Latino population there, and attempts to ensure that English-speaking wards home taught the Latino members within their boundaries, even if they attended separate Spanish-speaking congregations. Groberg also served as president of the North America West Area from 1990 to 1994. In May 1992, Groberg presided over the organization of the San Francisco California East Stake, the church's first Tongan-speaking stake in the United States. In 2000, Groberg was called into the Sunday School presidency.

In 2005, Groberg was designated as an emeritus general authority. From 2005 to 2008, he was president of the church's Idaho Falls Idaho Temple. Groberg's parents also served as president and matron of the temple from 1975 to 1980.

Personal life
Groberg married Jean Sabin and they have had 11 children. Groberg is an Eagle Scout and recipient of the Distinguished Eagle Scout Award.

Publications

See also
 John H. Groberg, "The Power of God's Love", ''Liahona, November 2004

References

External links 
 Elder John H. Groberg of the First Quorum of the Seventy
 
 Grampa Bill's General Authority Pages: John H. Groberg

1934 births
20th-century Mormon missionaries
American Latter Day Saint writers
American Mormon missionaries in Tonga
Brigham Young University alumni
Counselors in the General Presidency of the Sunday School (LDS Church)
Indiana University alumni
Living people
Members of the First Quorum of the Seventy (LDS Church)
Mission presidents (LDS Church)
People from Idaho Falls, Idaho
Presidents of the Seventy (LDS Church)
Regional representatives of the Twelve
Temple presidents and matrons (LDS Church)
American memoirists
Mormon memoirists
American general authorities (LDS Church)
Religious leaders from Idaho
Latter Day Saints from Idaho